The 2006 Oceania Handball Champions Cup was held in Noumea, New Caledonia in September, 2006. This was the first edition of the Men Oceania Champions Cup, organized in Noumea by the Ligue de Hand Ball Nouvelle Caledonie (LHBNC).

The final between the two best teams from New Caledonia saw JS Mont Dore taking the first ever Oceania Champions Cup. The third place play off, Auckland finished fourth after a last game lost after extra-time against the team from Wallis and Futuna.

Final standings

References

 Report on Auckland webpage
 Photos of tournament 

Oceania Handball Champions Cup
2006 in handball